Fan Lei (born 28 May 1983) is a Chinese retired para table tennis player. She has won four medals in two Paralympic Games (2008 and 2012).

Fan began playing at age 6, before her disability. In 1999, on her way home from a table tennis tournament, she was hit by a car and had a fractured right femoral head and avascular necrosis, which resulted in unequal leg length.

References

1983 births
Living people
Paralympic table tennis players of China
Chinese female table tennis players
Table tennis players at the 2008 Summer Paralympics
Table tennis players at the 2012 Summer Paralympics
Medalists at the 2008 Summer Paralympics
Medalists at the 2012 Summer Paralympics
People from Huixian
Paralympic gold medalists for China
Paralympic silver medalists for China
Paralympic bronze medalists for China
Paralympic medalists in table tennis
Table tennis players from Henan